Ski jumping at the 2006 Winter Olympics, was held over nine days, from 11 February to 20 February. Three events were contested in Pragelato.

Medal summary

Medal table

Events

Participating NOCs
Twenty-two nations participated in ski jumping at Torino.

References

 
2006
Ski jumping competitions in Italy
2006 in ski jumping
2006 Winter Olympics events
Men's events at the 2006 Winter Olympics